Mottville is a hamlet in the Town of Skaneateles, New York, United States.  Of note, a tornado touched down in Mottville on July 28, 2002.

History 
Here are some excerpts pertaining to Mottville from Vol. II, pp. 977–1015 of Onondaga's Centennial, edited by Dwight H. Bruce and published by Boston History Co., 1896 :

... The mills and factories gave existence to various other industries and three or four busy hamlets. Mottville, originally called "Sodom," and early written "Mottsville," was named from Arthur Mott, son of Mrs. Lydia P. Mott. He located here about 1820, had a woolen factory on the site of the old Coleman flouring mill, and was for some time a successful and prominent citizen. He finally succumbed to drink and died in Toledo, O., October 30, 1869, aged seventy-one. The pioneer on the site of Mottville was a "squatter" named Sabin Elliott. In 1836 the place contained about thirty dwellings, a post-office, one furnace, a grist and saw mill, and a tavern kept by W. H. Mershon. Among the merchants here were Earll, Watson & Co., Alanson Watson, S. L. Benedict, and Benedict Brothers (burned out in October, 1865). Here Putnam, Porter & Leonard built a wheel-head factory soon after 1816, and in 1831 were succeeded by S. C. Wheadon, Erastus Nye, and George P. Adams. George B. Harwood, formerly had a harness shop at this place. Skaneateles Falls also developed into quite a busy center and finally obtained a post-office. Other hamlets which sprung up were Kellogg's Mills, Willow Glen, and Glenside. ...

... Another paper, unique and short-lived, was the Communitist [sic], which was issued fortnightly by the Skaneateles Community, at Community Place, near Mottville, Onondaga County, N.Y., and which bore the motto: "Free inquiry—general progression—common possessions—oneness of interest—universal brotherhood." Its chief promoter was the Vermont born abolitionist and communalist John A. Collins; it was devoid of advertisements, and was started early in 1844. ...

... the "Friends Female Boarding School," known as the "Hive," ... was established on the Cuddeback farm on the west shore of [Skaneateles] lake by Mrs. Lydia P. Mott, soon after her arrival in about 1818. She was a daughter of Joseph Stansbury, was born on the Atlantic Ocean on February 23, 1775, and being en route to Philadelphia was christened Lydia Philadelphia Stansbury. Reared in the Episcopal church, she subsequently became a prominent member and preacher in the Society of Friends, and was married to Robert Mott, of New York, in 1797. After his death in Whitestown, N.Y., she came to Skaneateles and purchased the Dowling farm, where she resided with her son Arthur, the founder of Mottville. She is described as a sweet, lovely woman, benevolent, sympathetic, and simple, of much refinement, and an admirable teacher. Upon beholding one of her scholars with her hair curled she exclaimed, "Why, Debby, has thee got horns growing?" ...

Hamlets in New York (state)
Syracuse metropolitan area
Populated places established in 1820
1820 establishments in New York (state)
Hamlets in Onondaga County, New York